American Auto is an American television sitcom created by Justin Spitzer that premiered on NBC on December 13, 2021. In May 2022, the series was renewed for a second season which premiered on January 24, 2023.

Premise
The series follows the employees of Detroit-based Payne Motors. The company's struggles after a new CEO who knows little about cars is hired from the pharmaceutical industry.

Cast and characters

Main
 Ana Gasteyer as Katherine Hastings, Payne Motors' new CEO. Classic corporate shark who jumps from one company to another. Before that she was in a pharmacology company and often tries to make a parallel between that and car industry, but she knows nothing about cars. 
 Harriet Dyer as Sadie Ryan, Payne Motors' CCO
 Jon Barinholtz as Wesley Payne, grandson of Payne Motors' retired CEO and brat-type who doesn't really have a job but shows at headquarters every day 
 Tye White as Jack Fortin, a former assembly-line employee brought in to help in the C-suite who is like a counselor to Hastings 
 Michael Benjamin Washington as Cyrus Knight, Payne's Chief Product Designer
 Humphrey Ker as Elliot, Payne's General Counsel
 X Mayo as Dori, Hastings' assistant and social media addict

Guest
 Jeff Meacham as Brent
 Christopher Chen as Jin Tao-Kang, Payne Motors' CFO who dislikes Hastings and wants to leave Payne for Volkswagen
 Jerry Minor as Steve
 Tom McGowan as Ed
 Joshua Malina as Ted
 Jim O'Heir as Governor Tom Harper
 Andy Daly as Frank
 Matt Murray as Bennett
 Lombardo Boyar as Robin
 Betsy Sodaro as Alex
 Martha Kelly as Barb, a desk worker who starts to stalk Hastings 
 Ike Barinholtz as Landon Payne, who is in politics. 
 Brad Hall as Richard, Katherine's husband and a math teacher in a primary school. He's very supportive to her job until the charity dinner. 
 Ian Roberts as Charlie Altman
 Jim Meskimen as Soren McGarry
 Tom Bergeron as himself, roasting celebrities at the Payne charity dinner
 Marc Evan Jackson as Alan Strong
 Eric Stonestreet as Ian (season 2)
 Seth Meyers as himself (season 2)
 Ryan Reynolds as himself (season 2)
 Andy Richter as himself (season 2)
 Ben Feldman as Chase

Episodes

Series overview

Season 1 (2021–22)

Season 2 (2023)

Production

Development
American Auto has been in development since August 2013. TV writer Justin Spitzer, fresh off the success of The Office, wanted to produce a workplace comedy of his own, but would instead be set in the upper-management world. Spitzer sold his pitch to NBC, who put the idea as a put-pilot. The script did not go forward as a pilot, and Spitzer instead went to work on Superstore. After stepping down as showrunner of Superstore in April 2019 and signing an overall deal with Universal Television, Spitzer went back and redeveloped the American Auto script.

On January 23, 2020, it was given a pilot order by NBC. The pilot was directed by Jeffrey Blitz and written by Spitzer who was expected to executive produce alongside Aaron Kaplan and Dana Honor. Production companies involved with the series include Spitzer Holding Company, Kapital Entertainment and Universal Television. On January 12, 2021, it was announced that NBC had ordered the series. On May 12, 2022, NBC renewed the series for a second season.

Casting
In February 2020, Deadline reported Harriet Dyer had joined the cast as Sadie and later that Ana Gasteyer had also joined the cast as Katherine Hastings. In March, X Mayo joined the cast as Dori. In July, Tye White joined the cast as Jack, Michael B. Washington joined the cast as Cyrus, Humphrey Ker joined the cast as Elliot, and Jon Barinholtz joined the cast as Wesley.

Broadcast
The series premiered on December 13, 2021, at 10 p.m., with two "sneak [peek] episodes" and returned on January 4, 2022, in its regular time slot at 8 p.m. on Tuesdays. The second season premiered on January 24, 2023.

Reception

Critical response
The review aggregator website Rotten Tomatoes reported a 100% approval rating with an average rating of 6.1/10, based on 11 critic reviews. The website's critics consensus reads, "While American Autos hijinks don't bode well for the future of Payne Motors, they promise a hilarious sitcom with a solid foundation." Metacritic, which uses a weighted average, assigned a score of 68 out of 100 based on 11 critics, indicating "generally favorable reviews".

Ratings

Season 1

Season 2

Accolades
The series was nominated for Best Broadcast Network Series, Comedy, and Albertina Rizzo was nominated for Best Writing in a Broadcast Network or Cable Series, Comedy for the episode "Commercial" at the 2022 Hollywood Critics Association TV Awards.

Notes

References

External links 
 
 

2020s American single-camera sitcoms
2020s American workplace comedy television series
2021 American television series debuts
Automotive television series
English-language television shows
NBC original programming
Television series by Kapital Entertainment
Television series by Universal Television
Television shows set in Detroit